

See also

List of National Basketball League (Australia) seasons
List of NBL1 seasons

References

External links

 
Seasons
Women's sport-related lists